Araneta Center–Cubao station (also called Araneta–Cubao station or simply Cubao station) is an elevated Manila Metro Rail Transit (MRT) station situated on Line 3. The station is located in Cubao in Quezon City and is named after the old name of the Araneta City, a mixed-used development in the city.

The station is the fourth station for trains headed to Taft Avenue and the tenth station for trains headed to North Avenue. It is one of five stations on the line where passengers can catch a train going in the opposite direction without paying a new fare due to the station's layout. The other four stations are Shaw Boulevard, Boni, Buendia, Ayala, and Taft Avenue. It is also the only station on the line with its concourse level located below the platform.

Nearby establishments
The most recognizable landmark that the station is located at is Araneta City, which hosts shopping malls such as Gateway Mall, Ali Mall, and Farmers Plaza.  The Araneta City complex is also host an indoor arena, the Smart Araneta Coliseum. A local hotel, Nice Hotel, is located on the opposite side of the Farmers Plaza.

Transportation links
Due to its location at Araneta City, the station is located in a major transportation hub. Prior to the establishment of the EDSA Carousel, provincial buses stopped at the Araneta Center Bus Terminal within the complex. Currently, the EDSA Carousel does not stop at Cubao and as such, is served by other bus routes. Jeepneys for various destinations all over Metro Manila and Rizal province, taxis and tricycles are available upon request.  Traffic regulations, however, prohibit tricycles on EDSA and Aurora Boulevard.

The station is also the transfer point for commuters riding the Manila Light Rail Transit System Line 2, or Line 2. It is connected to its namesake station on the Line 2 via a walkway that goes through the New Farmers Plaza, past the Smart Araneta Coliseum and to the station's entrance just outside the Gateway Mall.

Operating Schedule 
Express Train Service

Note: This service was discontinued in 2014.

Gallery

See also
List of rail transit stations in Metro Manila
Manila Metro Rail Transit System Line 3

References

External links
The Metrostar Express
Araneta Center-Cubao Station (Line 3) satellite image on Google Maps

Manila Metro Rail Transit System stations
Railway stations opened in 1999
Buildings and structures in Quezon City
1999 establishments in the Philippines